The 2002–03 All-Ireland Senior Club Hurling Championship was the 33rd staging of the All-Ireland Senior Club Hurling Championship, the Gaelic Athletic Association's premier inter-county club hurling tournament. The championship began on 20 October 2002 and ended on 17 March 2002.

Birr were the defending champions.

On 17 March 2003 Birr won the championship following a 1–19 to 0–11 defeat of Dunloy in the All-Ireland final. This was their fourth All-Ireland title and their second title in succession.

Athenry's Eugene Cloonan was the championship's top scorer with 4-23.

Pre-championship
The build-up to the opening of the championship was dominated by Birr and the possibility that they would retain their All-Ireland title and lead the all-time club roll of honour with four championships. Having secured their fourth successive county championship title, Birr were favourites to retain their provincial title for a second year-in-a-row. This would leave them only two wins away from hurling immortality.

Results

Connacht Senior Club Hurling Championship

Quarter-finals

Semi-final

Final

Leinster Senior Club Hurling Championship

First round

Quarter-finals

Semi-finals

Final

Munster Senior Club Hurling Championship

Quarter-finals

Semi-finals

Final

Ulster Senior Club Hurling Championship

Semi-finals

Final

All-Ireland Senior Club Hurling Championship

Quarter-final

Semi-finals

Final

Championship statistics

Scoring statistics

Overall

Single game

Miscellaneous

 St. Mullin's qualified for the Leinster semi-finals for only the second time in their history.
 Birr inscribed their names into the GAA's history books by becoming the first club to win four All-Ireland titles.

References

2002 in hurling
2003 in hurling
All-Ireland Senior Club Hurling Championship